USS Kingsville (LCS-36) will be an  of the United States Navy. She will be the first ship to be named for Kingsville, Texas, which is home to Naval Air Station Kingsville.

Design
In 2002, the United States Navy initiated a program to develop the first of a fleet of littoral combat ships. The Navy initially ordered two trimaran hulled ships from General Dynamics, which became known as the  after the first ship of the class, . Even-numbered US Navy littoral combat ships are built using the Independence-class trimaran design, while odd-numbered ships are based on a competing design, the conventional monohull . The initial order of littoral combat ships involved a total of four ships, including two of the Independence-class design. On 29 December 2010, the Navy announced that it was awarding Austal USA a contract to build ten additional Independence-class littoral combat ships.

Construction and Career 
Kingsville is currently being built in Mobile, Alabama by Austal USA.

References

 

Proposed ships of the United States Navy
Independence-class littoral combat ships